Chefornak Airport  is a state-owned public-use airport in Chefornak, a city in the Bethel Census Area of the U.S. state of Alaska. The airport is on the Kinia River.

Most U.S. airports use the same three-letter location identifier for the FAA and IATA, but this airport is assigned CFK by the FAA and CYF by the IATA. The airport's ICAO identifier is PACK.

Facilities 
Chefornak Airport has one runway designated 16/34 with a gravel and dirt surface measuring 2,500 by 28 feet (762 x 9 m).

A new airstrip has been built further out from the village due to concerns with the current airstrip being near the school and pedestrian traffic; however, the runway must settle for several years before it is ready to be used.

Airlines and destinations 

Prior to its bankruptcy and cessation of all operations, Ravn Alaska served the airport from multiple locations.

Statistics

References

External links 
 Alaska FAA airport diagram (GIF)
 Resources for this airport:
 
 
 

Airports in the Bethel Census Area, Alaska